John MacRae may refer to:

 John Chester MacRae (1912–1997), Canadian school teacher, soldier and Canadian Member of Parliament from New Brunswick
 John David MacRae (1876–1967), Canadian Member of Parliament from Ontario
 John MacRae-Gilstrap (1861–1937), British army officer and restorer of Eilean Donan Castle
 John Macrae, Dean of Brechin, 1936–1947
 John MacRae, Professional musician from Glasgow, Scotland

See also
John Mecray (1937–2017), American realist artist specialising in Marine Art
John J. McRae (1815–1868), governor of Mississippi
John McCrae (1872–1918), Canadian poet and surgeon, author of the war poem "In Flanders Fields"
John McCrea (disambiguation)